Estimated equivalent results for House of Commons constituencies in England, Scotland and Wales were produced by Professor Chris Hanretty of Royal Holloway, University of London. Hanretty warned that "These figures on their own tell us almost nothing about future general elections" and "These figures remain estimates, and so they are subject to error." Martin Baxter of Electoral Calculus returned a slightly different set of seat estimates based on these results. Similarly, he noted that the estimates were not useful at predicting the results of general election, comparing UKIP's vote share in the 2014 EU election (27%) to its share in the 2015 UK general election (13%). Hanretty's estimates are shown in the map and the tables here.

Best and worst results for each party

References

2019 elections in the United Kingdom
United Kingdom
European Parliament elections in the United Kingdom